Hang Tuah (Jawi: , from /tuha/ or /toh/ (هوت) ) is said to have been a warrior who lived in Malacca during the reign of Sultan Mansur Shah in the 15th century. There is limited historical evidence for his existence. However, he was supposedly a great laksamana, or admiral, and a silat master. Hang Tuah is the most illustrious warrior figure in Malay literature. There is much in dispute about the factual basis of Hang Tuah's story.

Early life and background
While  historical facts regarding the early life and background of Hang Tuah are limited and his ethnicity is the source of some dispute; it has been reported that he had aboriginal Malay ancestry.  As a young boy, Hang Tuah worked as a woodcutter in his parents' shop. His grasp of spiritual concepts and potential as a fighter were apparent from a young age. At ten years old he learned silat together with his four comrades Hang Kasturi, Hang Jebat, Hang Lekir and Hang Lekiu. Their teacher was Adi Putera, a renowned master who lived a hermetic life at the top of a mountain. Under the guru's tutelage, Hang Tuah and his four compatriots were taught the arts of self-defense and meditation.
 
Hang Tuah's appearance in the history of the region began when some men ran amok near Kampung Bendahara. Tun Perak came with a party of guards to investigate the incident, but was also attacked. His guards fled but when Hang Tuah and his friends, who happened to be at a nearby stall, saw what was happening, they rushed to save Tun Perak. They fought the group and, because of their ferociousness, they ran away.

Tun Perak was amazed by the courage of Hang Tuah and his companions. He rewarded them and presented them to Sultan Muzaffar Syah.

Career

Hang Tuah's illustrious career as an admiral or laksamana includes tales of his absolute and unfaltering loyalty to his Sultan, some of which are chronicled in Sejarah Melayu (the semi-historical Malay Annals) and Hikayat Hang Tuah (a romantic collection of tales involving Hang Tuah). Hang Tuah is believed to have engaged in correspondence with the Ryukyu Islands.

Hang Tuah became the sultan's constant aide, accompanying the king on official visits to foreign countries. On one such visit to Majapahit, Hang Tuah fought a duel with the famed pendekar Taming Sari. After a brutal fight Hang Tuah emerged as winner, and then Singhavikramavardhana, the ruler of Majapahit, bestowed upon him Taming Sari's kris or dagger. The Keris Taming Sari was named after its original owner, and was purported to be magical, empowering its owner with physical invulnerability.

Hang Tuah also acted as the sultan's ambassador, travelling on the king's behalf to allied countries. Another story concerning Hang Tuah's legendary loyalty to the ruler is found in the Hikayat Hang Tuah, and involves his visit to Inderaputra or Pahang during one such voyage. The sultan sent Hang Tuah to Pahang with the task of persuading the princess Tun Teja, who was already engaged, to become the sultan's companion. Tun Teja fell under the impression that Hang Tuah had come to persuade her to marry him, not the sultan, and agreed to elope with him to Melaka. It was only during the voyage home that Hang Tuah revealed his deception to Tun Teja. The Hikayat Hang Tuah and Sejarah Melayu each carry different accounts of this incident. The Hikayat records that it was Hang Tuah who persuaded Tun Teja to elope with him, thus deceiving her.

Perhaps the most famous story in which Hang Tuah is involved is the fight with his closest childhood companion, Hang Jebat. Hang Tuah's deep loyalty to and popularity with the sultan led to rumours being circulated that Hang Tuah was having an illicit affair with one of the sultan's dayang (court stewardesses). The sultan then sentenced Hang Tuah to death without trial for the alleged offence. The death sentence was never carried out, however, because Hang Tuah's executioner, the bendahara (chief minister), went against the sultan's orders and hid Hang Tuah in a remote region of Melaka.

Believing that Hang Tuah was dead, murdered unjustly by the king he served, Hang Jebat decided to avenge his friend's death. Hang Jebat's revenge allegedly became a palace killing spree or furious rebellion against the sultan (sources differ as to what actually occurred). It remains consistent, however, that Hang Jebat wreaked havoc onto the royal court, and the sultan was unable to stop him, as none of the warriors dared to challenge the more ferocious and skilled Hang Jebat. The bendahara then informed the sultan that the only man who was able to stop Hang Jebat, Hang Tuah, was still alive. The bendahara recalled Hang Tuah from his hiding place and the warrior was given full amnesty by the sultan and was instructed to kill Hang Jebat. After seven gruelling days of fighting, Hang Tuah was able to kill Hang Jebat.

It is notable that the two main sources of Hang Tuah's life differ yet again on the details of his life. According to the Hikayat Hang Tuah, it was Hang Jebat who avenged his friend's death, only to be killed by the same friend, but according to Sejarah Melayu, it was Hang Kasturi. The Sejarah Melayu or the Malay Annals are unique in that they constitute the only available account of the history of the Malay Sultanate in the 15th and early 16th century, but the Hang Jebat story, as the more romantic tale, remains more popular.

Hang Tuah continued to serve Melaka after the death of Hang Jebat. Later in life, Hang Tuah was ordered by Sultan Mahmud Shah to court a legendary princess on the sultan's behalf. The Puteri Gunung Ledang (Princess of Mount Ledang) was so named because she resided on Mount Ledang at the Melaka-Johor border. According to legend, the Princess met with Hang Tuah, and only agreed to marry the sultan if he satisfied a list of requirements, or pre-wedding gifts. The list included a golden bridge linking Melaka with the top of Gunung Ledang, seven trays of mosquito livers, seven jars of virgins' tears and a bowl of the sultan's first-born son's blood. Hang Tuah knew the tasks would not be fulfilled, and was said to be so overwhelmed that he failed his king that he flung his kris into a river and vowed only to return to Melaka if it resurfaced, which it never did. It was also said that he then vanished into thin air. According to other sources, Hang Tuah lived to an old age, and his body is said to have been buried in Tanjung Kling in Melaka, where his tomb can still be seen today; however it is to be believed that his tomb is just a representation of his name and his body is actually buried elsewhere.

Other sources stated that, following the arrival of the Portuguese, Hang Tuah moved to Singapore.

Legacy 
Hang Tuah remains popular in Malaysia, embodying the values of allegiance and loyalty. The legend of the tragic friendship between Hang Tuah and Hang Jebat represents the conflict between loyalty and justice. 

Hang Tuah is associated with the saying, "Takkan Melayu hilang di dunia, selagi berpegang teguh kepada Agama Islam," meaning, "Never shall Malays vanish from the earth, as long as they adhere to the religion of Islam". The saying is a rallying cry for Malay nationalism. However, the source of the saying is not clear.

Hang Tuah has been the subject of an urban legend claiming that he was of Chinese descent.

In 2012, Khoo Kay Kim, a historian from the University of Malaya claimed that there was no historical evidence for Hang Tuah's existence.

Historicity 
Hang Tuah has been the subject of debate of historians for century. Before the 20th century, archeological findings have been abysmal and no source or literature survives directly written by the famed warrior. However University Putra Malaysia historian, Hashim Musa, published a journal that Hang Tuah may have been recorded in the official records of the Rekidai Hoan., an official historical document from the Ryukyu Kingdom compiled at least from the 16th century. The document which spans the period from the 15th to the 19th century records the arrival of a certain "Lezoumana" or "Lo-hsi-ma-na" which the researchers suggest is a Ryukyuan translation of the Malay word, Laksamana the title which according to the Malay Annals was the post Hang Tuah held during the Malacca Sultanate. Since Hang Tuah is never directly mentioned by name in those documents, these claim is generally dismissed by other historians.

In popular culture 
Hang Tuah is a prominent legendary figure in Malaysia's popular culture and his story has been adapted into several movies. Famous portrayals include:
 P. Ramlee in Hang Tuah (1956)
 Jamal Abdillah in Tuah (1990)
 Jalaluddin Hassan in XX Ray 2 (1995), a science-fiction film made by Aziz M. Osman about modern scientists who were sent back to the 15th century, when Hang Tuah was alive. The film imagines the hero getting his attributed quote Takkan Melayu Hilang Di Dunia from one of the scientists from the future
 M. Nasir in Puteri Gunung Ledang (2004)
 M. Nasir portrays Hang Tuah in a Kit Kat commercial where Hang Tuah (unrelated to the XX Ray 2 film) enters a modern convenience store

Places and things named after Hang Tuah

In Malaysia
 Five roads in Malaysia are named after Hang Tuah: Jalan Hang Tuah in Kuala Lumpur, and similarly named streets in Johor, Malacca, Muar, and Ipoh.
 A strip along Jalan Hang Tuah has been renamed Hang Tuah Mall and popularised as a tourist attraction.
 An LRT station and Monorail station in Kuala Lumpur is named  Hang Tuah. It is an interchange station.
 Medan Hang Tuah, a major food court and hawker centre is located at The Mall, Kuala Lumpur.
 Hang Tuah Stadium, a stadium in Malacca.
 Hang Tuah's Well, a water well in Malacca.
 Hang Tuah Jaya, a town and parliamentary constituency in Malacca.
 Admiral Hang Tuah Jamek Mosque, a mosque in Malacca.
 Hang Tuah Centre, an attraction in Malacca.
 Hang Tuah Village, a village in Malacca.
 Hang Tuah Bridge, a bridge in Malacca.
 Hang Tuah Hall, a building in Malacca.

In Indonesia 
 Certain roads in several major cities are named after the warrior as Jalan Hang Tuah: in Pekanbaru, Jakarta, Batam, Tanjung Pinang, Medan, Surabaya, Palembang, Padang, Palu, Denpasar, and Bandung
 Hang Tuah University, a major university established by the Indonesian Navy in Surabaya
 Hang Tuah Park, a Park in Riau Main Stadium in Pekanbaru
 Hang Tuah Stadium, a green space in Masjid Agung An-Nur in Pekanbaru

See also 
 Hang Jebat, close companion of Hang Tuah
 Hikayat Hang Tuah, an early 18th-century Malay epic
 Tanjong Kling, the mausoleum of Hang Tuah is located within the Mukim
 Legend of Puteri Gunung Ledang, a legendary princess whom Hang Tuah interacted with
 Malay folklore

References

Further reading 
 Richard O. Winstedt, A History of Malaya.

History of Malacca
Malay culture
Malaysian warriors
People from Malacca
Year of birth missing
Year of death missing